Afrojapyx is a genus of diplurans in the family Japygidae.

Species
 Afrojapyx africanus (Karsch, 1893)
 Afrojapyx congoanus Silvestri, 1948
 Afrojapyx mixtus Pagés, 1957
 Afrojapyx stricklandi Silvestri, 1948

References

Diplura